Veiterä is a Finnish bandy club based in Lappeenranta. It is the reigning national champion and has become the national champion six times for men's teams (1951, 1955, 1957, 1980, 2017 and 2018) and once for women's teams (2012).

External links

Bandy clubs in Finland
Sport in Lappeenranta
Bandy clubs established in 1950
1950 establishments in Finland